Keith McLean Callow (January 11, 1925 – April 4, 2008) was a justice of the Washington Supreme Court from 1985 to 1991.

Early life, education, military service, and career
Born in Seattle, Washington, Callow graduated from Lower Merion High School in 1943, and was drafted into the United States Army during World War II. Callow was wounded at the Battle of the Bulge, for which he received a Purple Heart. He thereafter received a B.A. from the University of Washington, followed by a law degree from the same institution. He was a law clerk to Justice Matthew W. Hill, and a trial lawyer, practicing law for seventeen years, including as an assistant attorney general, before serving as a judge in Washington state courts for fifteen years.

Judicial service
On July 5, 1969, Governor Daniel J. Evans appointed Callow to a seat on the King County Superior Court. Callow thereafter served for a period on the Washington Court of Appeals until 1985, when Callow was elected to a seat on the state supreme court that was to be vacated by the retirement of Hugh J. Rosellini. In 1990, Callow lost a bid for another term on the court, and thereafter worked for the United States Department of State, assisting attorneys and judges in Estonia and Kyrgyzstan with the establishment of post-Soviet legal systems.

Personal life and death
While attending the University of Washington, Callow met and married Evelyn Case, to whom he was married for 58 years, until her death. They had three children.

Callow died in Seattle at the age of 83, from complications of diabetes and a kidney failure that had inflicted him since 2006.

References

1925 births
2008 deaths
Lawyers from Seattle
University of Washington alumni
Law clerks
Justices of the Washington Supreme Court
Deaths from kidney failure